Leiden Shorts is an annual short film festival held in the city of Leiden, The Netherlands. Leiden Shorts (previously known as Leiden International Short Film Experience) was founded in 2009 as a cineclub and has grown to become one of the Netherlands' largest international short film festivals.

History 

Founded in 2009, LISFE (Leiden International Short Film Experience) was created by 5 cinema-loving expats. While they were studying at Leiden University, the first and oldest university in the Netherlands, they felt that short film was grossly underrepresented as an art form and sought to create a space where short film could truly be appreciated as a medium.

From their love of short film, a cineclub was born. Held in sporadic locations, it was an open space for cinephiles of all genres. Above all, this cineclub shone a new and open spotlight on short films.

Today, what was originally a one-day festival has grown into Leiden Shorts, one of the most prominent short film festivals in the Netherlands. Fourteen editions later, the now 4-day festival has gone from screenings in Leiden’s underground art spaces to collaborations co-hosted by Leiden’s cinemas. 

Next to the main festival in spring, Leiden Shorts is involved in cultural events throughout the year in collaboration with several organisations in Leiden and its surroundings. Examples are Leiden International Film Festival (LIFF), Leiden Observatory, RAP, Vrijplaats Leiden, Cultuurmaand, Nacht van Ondekkingen and Museumnacht Leiden.

Leiden Shorts is a member of Talking Shorts.

Jury 

Since 2012, the festival has three categories of awards – General Award, Student Award and Audience Award. In 2020, a National Award was created, and the General Award was renamed International Award.  The juries for the National, International, and Student Awards are generally composed of scholars, filmmakers and other film professionals alike. The audience votes during the festival and the results are announced on the last day of the festival.

Festival editions

1st Edition: 29 May 2009
Best Professional Film Jury Award: Spitted by Kiss (dir. Milos Tomić), Czech Republic
Best Professional Film Audience Award:  (dir. Guy Thys), Belgium

2nd Edition: 28–30 May 2010
Best Professional Film Jury Award: Efecto Domino (dir. Gagriel Gauchet), Cuba and Germany
Best Professional Film Audience Award: Edgar (dir. Fabian Busch), Germany

3rd Edition: 10 June 2011
Best Professional Film Jury Award: Casus Belli (dir. Yorgos Zoi), Greece
Best Professional Film Audience Award: Teclópolis (dir. Javier Mrad), Argentina
Best Student film Audience Award: Bastagon and the Rainbow Princess (dir. Marc Schlegel), Austria
Jury Honorable Mention: Air (dir. Fabrizio Fracassi and Florian Graf), Switzerland

4th Edition: 9 June 2012
Best Professional Film Jury Award: Bread (Ekmek) (dir. Koray Sevindi), Turkey
Best Professional Film Audience Award: The Hour's Home (A Casa das Horas) (dir. Heraldo Cavalcanti), Brazil
Best Student film Audience Award: Assemblé (dir. Miguel Ferraez from Universidad Anahuac), Mexico
Best Student film Jury Mention: Grandmothers (Abuelas) (dir. Afarin Eghbal from the National Film & Television School), UK
Jury Honorable Mention: The Counting Device (Numărătoarea manuală) (dir. Daniel Sandu), Romania
Jury Honorable Mention: The Star (Hviezda) (dir. Andrej Kolencik), Slovakia

5th Edition: 1–8 June 2013
Best Film Jury Prize: DYKWLI (Do you know what love is) (dir. Leni Huyghe), Belgium, 2012
Best Film Audience Award: Los Retratos (Portraits) (dir. Iván D. Gaona), Colombia, 2012
Beste Student Film Juryprijs: Adem'in kuyusu (Well of adem) (dir. Veysel Cihan Hızar), Turkey, 2012
Jury Honorable Mention: Marze shekaste (Broken border) (dir. Keywan Karimi), Iran, 2012

6th Edition: 1–3 May 2014
Held at Scheltema Leiden
General Award: Baghdad Messi (dir. Sahim Omar Kalifa), United Arab Emirates and Belgium, 2013

7th Edition: 30 April–2 May 2015
Held at Meelfabriek Leiden
Audience Award: Mama Agatha (dir. Fadi Hindash), Netherlands, 2014
General Award: Symphony no. 42 (dir. Réka Bucsi), Hungary, 2014

8th Edition: 29–30 April 2016 
Held at Haagwegvier Leiden
Audience Award: Within Four Walls (dir. Hyo Kaag), Netherlands, 2015
General Award: Allegory of the Jam Jar (dir, Boris Kuijpers & Ruth Mellaerts), Belgium, 2015

9th Edition:13–14 May 2017
Held at Het Leidse Volkshuis
Student Award: Digital Immigrants (dir. Dennis Stauffer & Nortbert Kottmann), Switzerland, 2016
Audience Award: Watu Wote (All of us) (dir. Katja Benrath), Germany, 2016
General Award: Il Silenzio (dir. Ali Asgari), Italy and France, 2016

10th Edition: 11–13 May 2018
Held at Kijkhuis
Student Award: Fast Alles (dir. Lisa Gertsch), Switzerland 2017 
Audience Award: Why I Wrote The Bible (Pourquoi J'ai écrit la Bible) (dir. Alexandre Steiger), France, 2017

General Award: 5 Years After The War (Cinq ans après la guerre) (dir. Samuel Albaric, Martin Wiklund, Ulysse Lefort), France, 2017

11th Edition: 9–12 May 2019 
Held at Kijkhuis
Student Award: Weltschmerz (dir. Jesper Dalgaard), Denmark, 2018
Audience Award: The Fathers Love Begotten (dir. Ian Thomas Ash), Japan, 2019
General Award: Between the Shadows (dir. Alice Guimarães & Mónica Santos), France and Portugal, 2018

12th Edition: 10–13 September 2020
Held at Kijkhuis
Theme: Climate (In)Justice
Student Award: Here and There (dir. Melisa Liebenthal), France and Argentina, 2019
National Award: Baba (dir. Sarah Blok & Lisa Konno), Netherlands, 2019
Audience Award: Invisível Herói (Invisible Hero) (dir. Cristèle Alves Meira), Portugal, 2019
International Award: Carne (Flesh) (dir. Camila Kater), Brazil, 2019

13th Edition: 2–5 September 2021 
Held at Kijkhuis
Theme: Rooted: Dutch Multicultural Society
Student Award: Filipiñana (dir. Rafael Manuel), Philippines and UK, 2020
National Award: Dear Chaemin (dir. Cyan Bae), Netherlands, 2020
Audience Award: White Eye (dir. Tomer Shushan), Israel, 2020
International Award: Heaven Reaches Down the Earth (dir. Tebogo Malebogo), South Africa, 2020

14th Edition: 9–12 June 2022 
Held at Kijkhuis
Theme: Between Fact and Fiction
Student Award: Ob Scena (dir. Paloma Orlandini Castro), Argentina, 2021
National Award: Minimal Sway While Starting My Way Up (dir. Stéphanie Lagarde), Netherlands, 2021
Audience Award: From the Balcony (dir. Aris Kaplanidis), Greece, 2021
International Award: It’s Raining Frogs Outside (dir. Maria Estela Paiso), Philippines, 2022

References

External links
 Official Webpage
 Official Instagram Account
 Filmfreeway Page
 Q&A: Leiden Shorts, 2012
 Leidschdagblad

Film festivals in the Netherlands
Experimental film festivals
Culture in Leiden
2009 establishments in the Netherlands
Recurring events established in 2009